The Sasha class is the NATO reporting name for a class of minesweepers built for the Soviet Navy between 1954 and 1956. The Soviet designation was Project 265.

Design
The specification for the design was issued in 1946. The ships were steel-hulled coastal minesweepers and were to replace wartime T301-class coastal sweepers. Following trials the bow shape was changed to improve sea-keeping and more advanced electronics and sweeps were introduced throughout the  service lives of these ships.

Ships
At total of 37 ships were built at Rybinsk. The last two ships were retired in 1992.

See also
List of ships of the Soviet Navy
List of ships of Russia by project number

References

  - also published as 
  All Sasha Class Minesweepers - Complete Ship List

Mine warfare vessel classes
Minesweepers of the Soviet Navy